Aaron Jarrell Hammons (born August 27, 1992) is an American former professional basketball player He played college basketball for Purdue before being drafted by the Dallas Mavericks with the 46th overall pick in the 2016 NBA draft.

High school career
Hammons first attended Carmel High School (Indiana), where he averaged 8.3 points and 7.8 rebounds as a sophomore, earning honorable mention Associated Press accolades. In his junior season, he transferred to Oak Hill Academy, where as a senior, he averaged 7.0 points, 6.8 rebounds and 4.0 blocks per game.

When he graduated, he was given a four-star rating by Scout.com and by Rivals.com.

College career
Hammons was named to the Big Ten All-Freshman Team at the conclusion of his first season playing for the Purdue Boilermakers, where he averaged 10.6 points, 6.0 rebounds and 2.0 blocks per game. At the conclusion of his sophomore season, Hammons had an average of 10.8 points, 7.4 rebounds and 3.1 blocks per game. He was awarded Honorable Mention All-Big Ten as well as being named to the Big Ten All-Defensive Team. He was named second-team All-Big Ten as a junior and was again awarded a spot on the Big Ten All-Defensive Team.

In his senior season, Hammons averaged 15.0 points, 8.2 rebounds, 2.5 blocks and 1.1 assists while shooting .592 from the floor. That season, he was named the 2016 Big Ten Defensive Player of the Year, first-team All-Big Ten, and was again named to the Big Ten All-Defensive Team. He was named to the 35-man midseason watchlist for the Naismith Trophy and was named one of the five finalists for the Kareem Abdul-Jabbar Award.

Professional career

Dallas Mavericks (2016–2017)
On June 23, 2016, Hammons was selected by the Dallas Mavericks with the 46th overall pick in the 2016 NBA draft. On July 8, 2016, he signed with the Mavericks and joined the team for the Las Vegas Summer League. During his rookie season, he had multiple assignments with the Texas Legends of the NBA Development League. He also had three 9-point efforts with the Mavericks during the season, to go with a season-best 7 rebounds on April 7, 2017 against the San Antonio Spurs.

Sioux Falls Skyforce (2017–2018)
On July 7, 2017, Hammons was traded to the Miami Heat in exchange for Josh McRoberts, a 2023 second round draft pick and cash considerations. Hammons was waived by the Heat on February 8, 2018 without appearing in a game for the team, instead spending the majority of his tenure on assignment with the Sioux Falls Skyforce.

NBA career statistics

Regular season

|-
| style="text-align:left;"| 
| style="text-align:left;"| Dallas
| 22 || 0 || 7.4 || .405 || .500 || .450 || 1.6 || .2 || .0 || .6 || 2.2
|- class="sortbottom"
| style="text-align:center;" colspan="2"|  Career
| 22 || 0 || 7.4 || .405 || .500 || .450 || 1.6 || .2 || .0 || .6 || 2.2

Personal life
The son of Tyrone and Alfreda Hammons, he has a brother, Tyrone Jr. He majored in organizational leadership and supervision.

References

External links

A. J. Hammons at purduesports.com

1992 births
Living people
African-American basketball players
American men's basketball players
Basketball players from Gary, Indiana
Centers (basketball)
Dallas Mavericks draft picks
Dallas Mavericks players
Oak Hill Academy (Mouth of Wilson, Virginia) alumni
People from Carmel, Indiana
Purdue Boilermakers men's basketball players
Sioux Falls Skyforce players
Texas Legends players
21st-century African-American sportspeople